Cerdas may refer to:

Cerdas Airport, an airport in Bolivia
Cerdas Barus (born 1961), Indonesian chess player
Sara Cerdas (born 1989), Portuguese politician